Jade Suvrijn (born 27 April 1995) is an inactive French tennis player.

Biography
On 23 June 2014, she achieved a career-high singles ranking of world No. 345. On 25 June 2018, she peaked at No. 551 in the doubles rankings. Suvrijn has won five singles titles and one doubles title on the ITF Circuit.

She made her Grand Slam debut at the 2018 French Open, having received a wildcard into the women's doubles tournament, partnering Virginie Razzano.

Suvrijn is the daughter of Dutch retired footballer Wilbert Suvrijn and his French wife.

ITF Circuit finals

Singles: 17 (5 titles, 12 runner–ups)

Doubles: 3 (1 title, 2 runner–ups)

External links
 
 

1995 births
Living people
French female tennis players
Sportspeople from Kerkrade
Sportspeople from Montpellier
French people of Dutch descent